"I Knew You Were Trouble" is a song by American singer-songwriter Taylor Swift, from her fourth studio album Red (2012). She wrote the song along with the track's producers, Max Martin and Shellback. A dance-pop, pop rock, and teen pop song with a dubstep refrain, "I Knew You Were Trouble" features electric guitars and synthesizers, with lyrics that talk about self-blame after a toxic relationship. The dubstep production divided music critics, who noted it as a radical move from Swift's previous country pop songs.

Big Machine Records, in partnership with Republic Records, released "I Knew You Were Trouble" in the US as the album's second pop-radio single on November 27, 2012. The song peaked within the top five on record charts and received multi-platinum certifications in Australia, Canada, New Zealand, and the UK. In the US, the single peaked at number two on the Billboard Hot 100 and was certified seven times platinum. Its seven-week run at number one on the Mainstream Top 40 chart inspired Swift to transition from country for mainstream pop on her next studio album, 1989 (2014).

The song's music video, directed by Anthony Mandler, premiered on MTV on December 13, 2012. The video depicts Swift going through a tumultuous relationship with an unfaithful man, and it won an MTV Video Music Award for Best Female Video and the Phenomenon Award at the YouTube Music Awards in 2013. To promote the song, Swift performed on televised events including the American Music Awards, the ARIA Music Awards, and the Brit Awards. She included "I Knew You Were Trouble" on the set lists of three of her world tours, the Red Tour (2013–2014), the 1989 World Tour (2015), and the Eras Tour (2023).

Background and production
Swift released her third studio album, Speak Now, in October 2010. She wrote the album by herself and co-produced it with Nathan Chapman. Speak Now was similar to Swift's previous album, Fearless (2008), in its country pop production style. On her fourth studio album, Red (2012), Swift wanted to experiment with other musical styles. To this end, she approached different producers beyond Nashville, Tennessee. She went to Los Angeles to meet with Swedish producer Max Martin, citing his songs for "how [they] can just land a chorus" as an inspiration. Martin and Shellback, another Swedish producer, co-wrote and produced three songs on Red—"22", "We Are Never Ever Getting Back Together", and "I Knew You Were Trouble"—all of which feature a pop production and programmed keyboards. Swift developed "I Knew You Were Trouble" as a ballad on piano, and asked Martin and Shellback to convey its intense emotions with a "chaotic" sound. The two producers incorporated elements of dubstep, a subgenre of EDM, which she said was Red boldest experimentation.

"I Knew You Were Trouble" was written by Swift, Martin, and Shellback. The song was recorded by Michael Ilbert at MXM Studios in Stockholm, Sweden, and by Sam Holland at Conway Recording Studios in Los Angeles. It was mixed by Şerban Ghenea at MixStar Studios in Virginia Beach, Virginia, and mastered by Tom Coyne at Sterling Sound Studio in New York City. In an interview with the Associated Press, Swift described Martin and Shellback as "dream collaborators" because they took her ideas in a different direction, which challenged her as a songwriter.

Release
Swift premiered one Red album track each week on Good Morning America, from September 24 until the album's release date of October 22, 2012, as part of a four-week countdown. "I Knew You Were Trouble" was the third song that Swift premiered, on October 8, 2012. The day after the Good Morning America premiere, Big Machine Records released the song onto the iTunes Store for digital download. Big Machine in partnership with Republic Records released "I Knew You Were Trouble" to US pop radio on November 27, 2012, as an official single. It was the second pop radio single from Red, following "We Are Never Ever Getting Back Together". A limited CD single edition featuring fan-exclusive merchandise was available through Swift's official website on December 13, 2012. "I Knew You Were Trouble" was released as a radio single in the U.K. on December 9, 2012, and in Italy on January 11, 2013.

On November 3, 2014, Swift removed her entire catalog from on-demand streaming platform Spotify, arguing that their ad-supported free service undermined the platform's premium service, which provides higher royalties for songwriters. In December 2015, the media reported that "I Knew You Were Trouble" had been re-delivered to Spotify, but its credit was mistakenly given to Welsh band Lostprophets and lead singer Ian Watkins. The song was removed from the site after three days. Swift re-added her entire catalog on Spotify in June 2017.

Music and lyrics

Swift described "I Knew You Were Trouble" as "just as chaotic as the feeling was when [she] wrote it". In the lyrics, she blames herself for a frustrating relationship that has ended, because she knows she could have stayed out of it but chose to ignore the red flags. Music critics described "I Knew You Were Trouble" as a dance-pop, pop rock, and teen pop song. It features bass guitar, electric guitar, and keyboard. The dubstep refrain includes a wobble, synthesizers, and Swift's distorted vocals. The instrumental halts at the bridge, where Swift contemplates on her past relationship: "You never loved me, or her, or anyone, or anything."

Critics considered the dubstep experimentation on "I Knew You Were Trouble" a significant departure from Swift's country pop beginnings. While describing how the song's style felt "sudden" and "unexpected" when compared to other tracks on Red, musicologist James Perone believed that it was "logical" for first-time listeners to react in surprise upon hearing "I Knew You Were Trouble" if they were familiar with Swift's work prior to its release. Jon Caramanica of The New York Times commented that the dubstep wobble was a "wrecking ball" that shifted the dynamic of not only "the song but also of Ms. Swift's career". Randall Roberts from the Los Angeles Times remarked that although dubstep had been popularized by DJs such as Zedd and Skrillex, "I Knew You Were Trouble" generated much discussion because it introduced the genre to a wider audience of mainstream pop, which had been "sonically conservative for the past half-decade". In Pitchfork, Brad Nelson commented that the production was "sharp as [Swift's] lyrics".

Critical reception
The dubstep experimentation divided contemporary critics. James Reed from The Boston Globe wrote that "I Knew You Were Trouble" and the other tracks produced by Martin and Shellback were unoriginal. Amanda Dobbins from Vulture felt the dubstep sound was not innovative, but praised the song as "yet another plucky, vowel-laden Taylor Swift breakup jam". In a Red album review for The Washington Post, Allison Stewart criticized the production as "gratuitous and weird" which overshadowed Swift's lyrics. In defense of Swift, Randall Roberts from the Los Angeles Times said it was "unfair to criticize a 22-year-old for adapting with the times". Though Roberts acknowledged that critics could dismiss the refrain's bass drop as conceit, it was justifiable for Swift—whom he considered a leading pop star—to experiment with mainstream trends.

In positive reviews, Jon Caramanica from The New York Times and Chris Willman from The Hollywood Reporter praised the song for exhibiting Swift's versatility beyond country. Slant Magazine Jonathan Keefe praised "I Knew You Were Trouble" as one of Red best tracks because "the production is creative and contemporary in ways that are in service to Swift's songwriting". In a review for Spin, Mark Hogan praised Swift's songcraft and remarked that although the dubstep experimentation initially came off as unoriginal, it "ultimately gets absorbed into [Swift's] own aesthetic".

The song featured on 2012 year-end lists by Spin (34th) and The Village Voice Pazz & Jop critics' poll (59th). Retrospective reviews of "I Knew You Were Trouble" have been generally positive. Hannah Mylrea from NME and Alexis Petridis from The Guardian considered the single a bold artistic statement for Swift, ranking it among the best songs of her catalog. In a 2021 retrospective review, Laura Snapes from The Guardian commented that the song was "the rare pop-EDM crossover" that stood the test of time.

Commercial performance
In the US, after its digital release, "I Knew You Were Trouble" debuted at number three on the Billboard Hot 100 and number one on the Digital Songs chart with 416,000 copies sold during the first week. It was Swift's eleventh song to debut in the top ten of the Hot 100. Together with Red lead single "We Are Never Ever Getting Back Together", it made Swift the first artist in digital history to have two 400,000 digital sales opening weeks. After its radio release, the single returned to the top ten on the Billboard Hot 100 and the number-one position on the Digital Songs chart in December 2012 – January 2013. Buoyed by strong digital sales, "I Knew You Were Trouble" reached its peak at number two on the Hot 100 chart dated January 12, 2013, behind Bruno Mars' "Locked Out of Heaven" (2012).

The single was Swift's first number-one entry on Billboard Adult Top 40. Despite not being released to country radio, the single debuted and stayed for one week at number fifty-five on the Country Airplay chart in April 2013, resulted from thirty-three unsolicited plays from Los Angeles radio station KKGO. "I Knew You Were Trouble" spent seven weeks atop the Mainstream Top 40, a chart monitoring pop radio in the US. It was her second Mainstream Top 40 number one, following 2008's "Love Story", and became her single with the most weeks atop the chart. The single's success on pop radio prompted Swift to abandon country and transition to pop on her next studio album, 1989 (2014), which was executive-produced by Swift and Martin. By July 2019, "I Knew You Were Trouble" had sold 5.42 million digital copies in the US. The Recording Industry Association of America (RIAA) certified the single seven times platinum for surpassing seven million units based on sales and on-demand streaming.

In Canada, the single peaked at number two on the Canadian Hot 100 and was certified five times platinum by Music Canada (MC). "I Knew You Were Trouble" charted in the top ten on record charts of European countries, peaking at number one in the Czech Republic, number three in Denmark, number four in Ireland, number five in Poland, number six in Austria and Russia, number eight in the Commonwealth of Independent States and Switzerland, number nine in Germany, and number ten in Belgian Flanders and Finland. The song received platinum certifications in Germany and Switzerland. In the U.K., "I Knew You Were Trouble" peaked at number two on the singles chart and was certified double platinum by the British Phonographic Industry (BPI). It peaked at number three and was certified multi-platinum in Australia (six times platinum) and New Zealand (double platinum).

Music video

Anthony Mandler directed the music video for "I Knew You Were Trouble". Shot in Los Angeles over two days, the video stars Reeve Carney as Swift's love interest. In the video, Swift wears a pink ombré hairstyle, a ripped tee-shirt, and skinny jeans. Marie Claire commented that this "edgy" look coincided with her much publicized relationship with English singer Harry Styles, which signified her outgrowing "good girl" public image.

Swift summarized the video's narrative: "I wanted to tell the story of a girl who falls into a world that's too fast for her, and suffers the consequences." The video begins with Swift waking up in a desert filled with trash and debris from a concert the night before, intertwined with flashbacks of her and her love interest. Swift delivers a monologue reflecting on the past relationship, concluding: "I think that the worst part of it all wasn't losing him. It was losing me." As the song begins, Swift and the love interest are seen sharing intimate moments together. He exhibits behaviors that are unreliable, engaging in bar fights and making out with other girls in a rave. The video concludes with Swift alone in the same desert from the beginning.

Media publications commented on the video's narrative and style. Spin Chris Martins and Vulture Amanda Dobbins noted similarities—the desert settings, the "bad boy" love interests, the partying scenes—to Lana Del Rey's 2012 video for "Ride", while Rolling Stone compared the downward spiral of Swift's relationship to that portrayed in Rihanna's 2011 video for "We Found Love". Comments by Wendy Geller from Yahoo!, Melinda Newman from Uproxx, and Rachel Brodsky from MTV focused on the video's dark narrative, which depicted a new aspect of Swift's artistry. Martins was not enthusiastic, calling the video unoriginal. A remix of "I Knew You Were Trouble" containing sounds of a screaming goat went viral, resulting in internet memes and boosting the video's popularity.

Accolades
"I Knew You Were Trouble" was one of the award-winning songs at the 2014 BMI Awards. It was one of the "Most Performed Songs" awarded at the 2014 ASCAP Awards, in honor of songwriters and producers. The song won Song of the Year at the 2013 Radio Disney Music Awards. At the 2013 MTV Video Music Awards, "I Knew You Were Trouble" won Best Female Video and was nominated for Video of the Year; it was Swift's second win in the category following "You Belong with Me in 2009. It also won YouTube Phenomenon at the inaugural YouTube Music Awards in 2013. The song received nominations at popularity-catered awards ceremonies including Nickelodeon Australian Kids' Choice Awards, Teen Choice Awards, and Nickelodeon Kids' Choice Awards.

Live performances

Swift performed "I Knew You Were Trouble" for the first time at the 2012 American Music Awards, held at Nokia Theatre L.A. Live on November 18, 2012. She embarked on a promotional tour for Red in Australia and performed the song on Today and the ARIA Music Awards. During Red promotional campaign in the US, Swift included "I Knew You Were Trouble" in her performances at KIIS-FM Jingle Ball on December 1, Z100 Jingle Ball Concert at Madison Square Garden on December 7, and on Dick Clark's New Year's Rockin' Eve at Times Square on December 31, 2012.

On January 18, 2013, following an appearance at the NRJ Music Awards, Swift held a private concert in Paris, where she included "I Knew You Were Trouble" in the set list. She also made live appearances in the U.K., performing the song at the 33rd Brit Awards on February 20, and on The Graham Norton Show on February 23, 2013. "I Knew You Were Trouble" was part of the regular set list of the Red Tour (2013), a world tour Swift embarked on to promote the album. During the concerts, Swift first performed in a white-and-gold gown with masquerade dancers, and midway changed the costume to black romper and high heels.

"I Knew You Were Trouble" is a recurring song included in many of Swift's live performances outside promotion of Red. She performed the song at the Victoria's Secret Fashion Show 2013, broadcast by CBS on December 10, 2013. During the promotion of her 2014 album 1989, Swift performed the song at the iHeartRadio Music Festival on September 19, the We Can Survive benefit concert at the Hollywood Bowl on October 24, and the Jingle Ball Tour 2014 on December 5, 2014.

During the concerts of the 1989 World Tour (2015), she included an industrial rock-oriented version of "I Knew You Were Trouble" in the set lists. An acoustic version of "I Knew You Were Trouble" was a "surprise song" Swift performed at the first concert in Manchester, England, and the concert in Perth, Australia, as part of her Reputation Stadium Tour (2018). During the promotion of her 2019 album Lover, Swift again performed the song at the Wango Tango festival on June 1, the Amazon Prime Day concert on July 10, and the City of Lover one-off concert in Paris on September 9, 2019. At the 2019 American Music Awards, where she was honored as the Artist of the Decade, Swift performed "I Knew You Were Trouble" as part of a medley of her biggest hits. Swift included the song on the set list of the Eras Tour (2023).

Credits and personnel
Credits and personnel are adapted from the liner notes of Red.

Taylor Swift – lead vocals, backing vocals, writer
Max Martin –  producer, writer, keyboards
Shellback –  producer, writer, acoustic guitar, electric guitar, bass, keyboards, programming
Tom Coyne – mastering
Eric Eylands – assistant
Şerban Ghenea – mixing
John Hanes – engineering
Sam Holland – recording
Michael Ilbert – recording
Tim Roberts – assistant
JoAnn Tominaga – production co-ordinator

Charts

Weekly charts

Year-end charts

All-time charts

Certifications

"I Knew You Were Trouble (Taylor's Version)"

Following the controversy regarding the ownership of her back catalog in 2019, Swift confirmed in November 2020 that she would be re-recording her entire back catalog. Swift previewed the re-recorded version of "I Knew You Were Trouble", subtitled "Taylor's Version", via her Instagram on August 5, 2021. The re-recorded version was produced by Swift, Shellback, and Christopher Rowe. It was engineered and edited at Prime Recording in Nashville, and Swift's vocals were recorded at Conway Recording Studio in Los Angeles and Kitty Committee Studio in Belfast.

"I Knew You Were Trouble (Taylor's Version)" was released as part of her second re-recorded album, Red (Taylor's Version), on November 12, 2021, through Republic Records. Unlike the original track, the title of the re-recorded version is not stylized with a period at the end. Critics complimented the sharper reworked instrumentation for better conveying the emotion.

After Red (Taylor's Version) was released, "I Knew You Were Trouble (Taylor's Version)" entered the top 30 of charts in Australia (21), Canada (29), New Zealand (26), and Singapore (13). It peaked at number 23 on the Billboard Global 200. In the US, the re-recording peaked at number 46 on the Billboard Hot 100 and number 16 on Billboard Adult Contemporary chart.

Personnel
Adapted from Red (Taylor's Version) liner notes

 Christopher Rowe – producer, lead vocals engineer
 Shellback – producer
 Taylor Swift – producer, lead vocals, background vocals
 Max Bernstein – synthesizers
 Matt Billingslea – drums programming
 Bryce Bordone – engineer
 Dan Burns – additional programming, additional engineer
 Derek Garten – engineer, editor
 Şerban Ghenea – mixing
 Amos Heller – bass guitar
 Sam Holland – lead vocals engineer
 Mike Meadows – acoustic guitar, synthesizers
 Paul Sidoti – electric guitar

Charts

Weekly charts

Year-end charts

See also
 List of number-one digital songs of 2012 (U.S.)
 List of number-one digital songs of 2013 (U.S.)
 List of Mainstream Top 40 number-one hits of 2013 (U.S.)
 List of Adult Top 40 number-one singles of 2013

Footnotes

References

2012 singles
2012 songs
American pop rock songs
Taylor Swift songs
Big Machine Records singles
Songs written by Taylor Swift
Songs written by Max Martin
Songs written by Shellback (record producer)
Dance-pop songs
Song recordings produced by Max Martin
Song recordings produced by Shellback (record producer)
Song recordings produced by Taylor Swift
Song recordings produced by Chris Rowe
Music videos directed by Anthony Mandler
MTV Video Music Award for Best Female Video
Internet memes introduced in 2012